
Espada or espadas may refer to:
A sword, especially the Spanish espada ropera
Lamborghini Espada, an Italian car produced between 1968 and 1978
USS Espada (SS-355), American submarine whose construction was cancelled
 The Portuguese name for a black scabbardfish

Entertainment
Espadas, one of the four suits of Spanish playing cards
Espada, a character in Don Quixote (ballet)
Espada (Bleach), a faction of characters in the anime series Bleach
Granado Espada, Korean fantasy video game
Espada was a tribe on Survivor: Nicaragua

Geology
Espada Formation, rock formation in California
Espadas Peak, mountain on the Spanish side of the Pyrenees
Serra d'Espadà, mountain range in Castellón, Spain

People
Ángel Espada (born 1948), Puerto Rican boxer 
Edu Espada (born 1981), Spanish footballer 
Frank Espada (1930 – 2014), American photojournalist and activist
Guty Espadas (born 1954), Mexican boxer
Guty Espadas Jr. (born 1974), Mexican boxer
Ibán Espadas (born 1978), Spanish footballer
Joe Espada (born 1975), Puerto Rican baseball player and coach
Juan Espadas (born 1966), Spanish politician, Mayor of Seville
Martín Espada (born 1957), American poet
Pedro Espada Jr. (born 1953), American ex-convict and politician
Rafael Espada (born 1944), former Vice President of Guatemala

Places
Espada Cemetery, Havana, Cuba
Mission Espada, Catholic mission established in 1690 in Texas
Rancho La Espada, ranch in California

See also
Espadon (disambiguation)
Spada (disambiguation)